Takleh-ye Bakhsh-e Do is a village in Tazeh Kand Rural District of Tazeh Kand District, Parsabad County, Ardabil province, Iran. At the 2006 census, its population was 1,491 in 295 households. The following census in 2011 counted 1,448 people in 361 households. The latest census in 2016 showed a population of 1,515 people in 450 households; it was the largest village in its rural district.

References 

Parsabad County

Towns and villages in Parsabad County

Populated places in Ardabil Province

Populated places in Parsabad County